Olivier Charles Armand Adrien Mazel (16 September 1858 – 10 March 1940) was a French Army general during World War I. He commanded the First (25 March 1916 – 31 March 1916) and Fifth Armies (31 March 1916 - 22 May 1917) during the war.

Decorations
Légion d'honneur
Knight (11 July 1898)
Officer (12 July 1911)
Commander (13 July 1915)
Médaille Interalliée de la Victoire
Médaille Commémorative de la Grande Guerre
Médaille Coloniale with "Tunisie" bar
Distinguished Service Medal (US)
Companion of the Order of the Bath (UK)

1858 births
1940 deaths
French generals
French military personnel of World War I
Recipients of the Distinguished Service Medal (US Army)
Commandeurs of the Légion d'honneur
Officiers of the Légion d'honneur
Chevaliers of the Légion d'honneur
Foreign recipients of the Distinguished Service Medal (United States)